Arthrobotrys elegans is a species of mitosporic fungi in the family Orbiliaceae. It is found on dung.

References

 Arthrobotrys elegans at Mycobank

Pezizomycotina
Fungi described in 1983